Hieracium lachenalii, also known as  common hawkweed or yellow hawkweed, is a species of plant in the tribe Cichorieae within the family Asteraceae. It is native to Europe but has become established as a weed in Australia and parts of North America. The species was widely known for many years as H. vulgatum, but more recent studies have indicated that the two names represent the same species. The name H. lachenalii was coined in 1802, H. vulgatum in 1819, so the older name is to be used.

Description
The rhizome is short and stout.
Each flower head has 40-80 ray florets but no disc florets
Bracts surround the flower head; the receptacle (basal part of the flower on which the florets are attached) is flat and naked; heads tend to start together then become somewhat solitary on long leafless stems.
The stalks below the heads are covered with scattered, simple and gland-tipped black hairs and contain a milky substance.

The pale yellow flowers are produced during all of the summer months. The fruit are dark brown achenes.

Common names

Distribution and habitat
Native to most of Europe, Hieracium lachenalii was introduced to cooler parts of North America, and to Australia. It can sometimes be found in soils that have been disturbed.

Europe
Austria, Belarus,  Belgium, Bosnia-Herzegovina, Channel Islands, Republic of Croatia, Corsica, Czech Republic, Denmark, Estonia, France, Finland, Germany, Republic of Hungary, Ireland, Italy, Latvia, Principality of Liechtenstein, Lithuania, Grand Duchy of Luxemburg, Montenegro, Netherlands, North Macedonia, Republic of North Ossetia–Alania, Norway, Republic of Poland, Romania, San Marino, Serbia, Slovenia, Slovakia, Sweden, Switzerland, Ukraine, United Kingdom, Vatican City, and various oblasts of Russia:

and its autonomous republics:

and Portugal.

North America
Subarctic America: Greenland.

Canada: British Columbia, New Brunswick, Newfoundland, Nova Scotia, Ontario, Prince Edward Island, Quebec.

United States: Connecticut, Delaware, Maine, Massachusetts, Michigan, Minnesota, New Hampshire, New Jersey, New York, Oregon, Pennsylvania, Rhode Island, Vermont, Washington, Wisconsin.

References

External links

lachenalii
Flora of Europe
Plants described in 1802